Gimyujeong Station (formerly Sinnam Station) is a railway station of the Gyeongchun Line in Sindong-myeon, Chuncheon-si, Gangwon-do, South Korea. It is named after the Korean novelist Kim You-jeong.

Station Layout

References

Seoul Metropolitan Subway stations
Metro stations in Chuncheon
Railway stations opened in 1939